The 2022 Nebraska gubernatorial election took place on November 8, 2022, to elect the governor of Nebraska. Incumbent Republican Governor Pete Ricketts was term-limited and unable to seek a third term. In the general election, Republican Jim Pillen went on to win the gubernatorial election by a 23-point margin.

Nebraska's primary elections were held on May 10. Former University of Nebraska Board of Regents chair Jim Pillen won the Republican nomination, while state senator Carol Blood won the Democratic nomination. 

The race took on increased importance in October 2022, when U.S. Senator Ben Sasse announced he would resign and Ricketts said he would allow the winner of the 2022 gubernatorial election to appoint Sasse's replacement. In the end Jim Pillen appointed former Republican Governor Pete Ricketts in Sasse's place.

Republican primary

Candidates

Nominated
Jim Pillen, member and former chair of the University of Nebraska Board of Regents
 Running mate: Joe Kelly, former U.S. Attorney for the District of Nebraska

Eliminated in primary
Donna Carpenter, contractor
Michael Connely, educational advisor, quality assurance director, small-scale agribusiness, USMC veteran
Charles Herbster, agribusiness executive and candidate for governor in 2014 
 Running mate: Dave Rippe, real estate broker and former director of the Nebraska Department of Economic Development
Lela McNinch
Breland Ridenour, information technology manager
Theresa Thibodeau, former state senator and former chair of the Douglas County Republican Party
 Running mate: Trent Loos, agriculture advocate and podcast host

Declined
Deb Fischer, U.S. Senator
Mike Flood, state senator, former Speaker of the Nebraska Legislature, and candidate for governor in 2014
Mike Foley, Lieutenant Governor of Nebraska, former Nebraska State Auditor, and candidate for governor in 2014 (running for State Auditor; endorsed Herbster)
Jeff Fortenberry, former U.S. Representative for  
Dave Heineman, former governor
Mike Hilgers, Speaker of the Nebraska Legislature (running for Attorney General)
Greg Ibach, former U.S. Under Secretary of Agriculture for Marketing and Regulatory Programs and former Nebraska Director of Agriculture
Dave Nabity, financial adviser, talk show host, and candidate for governor in 2006
Bryan Slone, president of the Nebraska Chamber of Commerce and candidate for governor in 2014
John Stinner, state senator
Jean Stothert, Mayor of Omaha (endorsed Lindstrom)

Endorsements

Polling
Graphical summary

Results

Pillen, Herbster, and Lindstrom all won their respective home counties – Pillen won Platte County with 66.3% of the vote, Herbster won Richardson County with 55.7% of the vote, and Lindstrom won Douglas County with 39.5% of the vote. Lindstrom won the Omaha metropolitan area and came close to winning Lancaster County, home to state capital Lincoln, losing to Pillen by about 2.1%. Pillen and Herbster won parts of more rural Nebraska. While Herbster won most of the Sandhills region, Pillen won most of northeastern Nebraska and counties along the I-80 corridor.

Democratic primary

Candidates

Nominated
 Carol Blood, state senator
 Running mate: Al Davis, former state senator

Eliminated in primary
 Roy A. Harris

Withdrew
Bob Krist, former state senator and nominee for governor in 2018 (endorsed Lindstrom)

Declined
Sara Howard, member of the Omaha Public Power District board and former state senator
Steve Lathrop, state senator
Alisha Shelton, Behavioral Health Clinical Supervisor and candidate for U.S. Senate in 2020 (running for U.S. House)
Tony Vargas, state senator (running for U.S. House)

Endorsements

Results

Libertarian primary

Candidates

Declared
Scott Zimmerman, businessman, comedian, founder of Z-Trak Productions and nominee for lieutenant governor in 2014
Running mate: Jason Blumenthal

Results

General election

Predictions

Endorsements

Polling

Results

See also 
 2022 Nebraska elections

Notes 

Partisan clients

References

External links 
Official campaign websites
 Carol Blood (D) for Governor
 Jim Pillen (R) for Governor
 Scott Zimmerman (L) for Governor

2022
Nebraska
Gubernatorial